Oriental Port (French: Porte d'orient) is a 1950 French crime film directed by Jacques Daroy and starring Yves Vincent, Tilda Thamar and Nathalie Nattier. It is about a group of smugglers operating out of Marseille. It is based on a novel by René Roques. The film was the first French production to be shot using the Belgian Gevacolor process.

Cast
 Yves Vincent as Vaucourt  
 Tilda Thamar as Mme. Valnis  
 Nathalie Nattier as Arlette  
 Marcel Dalio as Zarapoulos  
 Antonin Berval as Capitaine Palmade  
 René Blancard as Baptiste  
 Lucas Gridoux as Le malais  
 Henri Arius as Bonail  
 Fernand Sardou as Gustave  
 René Sarvil as Thomas, un douanier  
 Jacqueline Huet as La comtesse  
 Annie Hémery as La passagére  
 Agnès Laury 
 Alfred Goulin 
 Fabienne Clery 
 Max André 
 Louis Viret 
 Edmond Guiraud 
 Lucie Debret

References

Bibliography 
 Goble, Alan. The Complete Index to Literary Sources in Film. Walter de Gruyter, 1999.
 Hayward, Susan. French Costume Drama of the 1950s: Fashioning Politics in Film. Intellect Books, 2010.

External links 
 

1950 crime films
French crime films
1950 films
1950s French-language films
Films directed by Jacques Daroy
Films set in Marseille
1950s French films